Herbert Brown may refer to:

Herbert Brown (Australian politician) (1839–1929), New South Wales politician
Herbert Brown (footballer), English football left back 
Herbert Brown (cricketer) (1867–?), English cricketer
Herbert Brown (ornithologist) (1848–1913), American ornithologist
Herbert C. Brown (1912–2004), American chemist and Nobel Prize laureate
Herbert Charles Brown (public servant) (1874–1940), Australian public servant
Herbert D. Brown (1870–1963), head of the United States Bureau of Efficiency
Herbert R. Brown (born 1931), lawyer and author from the U.S. state of Ohio
Herbert Brown, character in Buck Privates Come Home
Herb Brown (born 1936), American basketball coach

See also
Bert Brown (disambiguation)
Herbert Browne (disambiguation)